The Paris Opera Awards (POA) is an international contest for opera singers held in Paris, France. It is held under the patronage of the French representation at the European Commission.

History
The first edition of POA was launched in March 2012. It allowed seventy-eight opera singers from South Africa, Albania, Germany, Argentina, Armenia, Austria, Australia, Belgium, Bosnia and Herzegovina, Bulgaria, Georgia, Italy, Japan, Mexico, the Netherlands, Poland, the Czech Republic, the United Kingdom, the United States, Russia, Switzerland, Ukraine and Uruguay to participate. The fifty best results were reviewed by the panel of judges. The ten finalists (five women and five men) auditioned for the judges at the Salle Gaveau in Paris on January 4, 2013.  of Radio Classique was the host. The gala was dedicated to Maria Callas.

Objective

This award is an international competition for opera singers. It aims to help showcase opera singers to the professional opera world and to the Parisian public. The contest is open to all opera singers who are at least 18 years old. It is open to the following voice types: soprano, mezzo-soprano, contralto, countertenor, tenor, baritone, and bass. The winners are chosen by the judges at the finals gala in Paris which is open to the public. The most important prize that the competition confers is the fame that the award confers.

Organization
The contest includes several rounds: preliminary, semi-final and final. Following these events, the awards are chosen by the Grand Jury. The competition is organized annually by the Association POA located at 7, rue Albert-de-Lapparent in Paris in the 7th arrondissement. The contest rules are posted on the website and translated into several languages.

Jury 2013 and 2014

The jury is composed of noted individuals of the music world: opera singers, conductors, directors opera houses and artistic agents. The grand jury for 2013 (first edition) was composed of three renowned artists from the world of opera: Sherrill Milnes, baritone (United States), Martina Arroyo, soprano (United States) and Daniel Lipton, conductor (Canada). After the finals concert they selected six winners, three women and three men. There was also an audience award given and a special prize in honor of Maria Callas was given by the organizers.

The panel of judges for the 2014 contest consisted of:
Richard Bonynge, (Australian conductor, president of jury)
Martina Franck, (from Germany, artistic director at Cologne Opera)
, (producer, TV and radio host, from France)
Maurice Xiberras, managing director at the Opéra de Marseille (France)
Germinal Hilbert, founder and chairman of Hilbert Artists Management (Germany)
Dominique Riber, artistic chief officer and artists manager at Opéra et Concert in Paris (France)
Christian Schirm, director of The Atelier Lyrique of Opéra national de Paris (France)
Vincent Monteil, director of The Opera Studio at the Opéra national du Rhin (France)
Sophie Duffaut, artistic administrator at Chorégies d'Orange festival (France)

Winners

2013
Category: Women
 Mary-Jean O'Doherty, coloratura soprano, Australia - first prize
 Jennifer O'Loughlin, coloratura soprano, USA – 2nd prize
 Ulyana Aleksyuk, coloratura soprano, Ukraine 3rd prize
Category: Men
 Julien Dran, tenor, France – first prize
 Dmitry Lavrov, baritone, Russia – 2nd prize
 Nam Kyu Choung, tenor, South Korea – 3rd prize
Maria Callas Award: Jennifer O'Loughlin
Audience Award: Jennifer O'Loughlin

2014

Category: Women
 Daria Terekhova, coloratura soprano, Russia – first prize
 Marina Nachkebiya, coloratura soprano, Georgia – 2nd prize
 Leonie Renaud, coloratura soprano, Switzerland – 3rd prize
Category: Men
 Pietro di Bianco, bass-baritone-, Italy – first prize
 Xiaohan Zhai, bass-baritone, China – 2nd prize
 Sam Roberts-Smith, baritone, Australia – 3rd prize
Best Performance Award: Sam Roberts-Smith
Audience Award: Daria Terekhova

References

External links
Organisational details, Cité de la Musique

Opera competitions
Music in Paris
French music awards
2012 establishments in France
Awards established in 2012